Pilica may refer to:

Pilica (river) in south-central Poland
Pilica (Bajina Bašta), a village in the municipality of Bajina Bašta, Serbia
Pilica, Masovian Voivodeship, a village in east-central Poland
Gmina Pilica, an administrative district in Zawiercie County, Silesian Voivodeship, Poland
Pilica, Silesian Voivodeship, seat of the district
Pilica (fly), a genus of robber flies